David Currie may refer to:
 David Currie (broadcaster), BBC Scotland sports broadcaster
 David Currie (conductor), Canadian conductor
 David Currie (footballer) (born 1962), former Middlesbrough FC player
 Dave Currie (footballer) (1876–1912), Australian rules footballer for Essendon
 David Vivian Currie (1912–1986), Canadian recipient of the Victoria Cross
 David Currie, Baron Currie of Marylebone (born 1946), British economist, member of the House of Lords
 David P. Currie (1936–2007), American law professor
 Dave Currie (born 1945), New Zealand sports administrator

See also
 David Curry (born 1944), British politician
 Dave Currey (disambiguation)